The Aqua Centurions is a professional swimming club and one of the original eight clubs of the International Swimming League. The team is based in Rome, IT led by General Manager Alessandra Guerra and Head Coach Matteo Giunta.

The team participated at three matches in the first ISL season, starting with the first match in Indianapolis, USA, then Naples, Italy, continued and finished at the European Derby in London, UK, without making it to the Final in Las Vegas, USA.

2019 International Swimming League season

Team roster 
ISL teams had a maximum roster of 32 athletes for 2019 season, with a suggested size of each club's travelling roster of 28 (14 men and 14 women). Each club had a captain and a vice-captain of different gender.

Centurions had a majority of Italians on their team with athletes from seven other countries around the world.

Match results 
In the 2019 inaugural ISL season, the Aqua Centurions fought despite the lack in athletes specialize in the Skin Races.

After the first race in Indianapolis, the Team improved in the "Home Edition" in Naples, Italy, with extraordinary results by Nicolò Martinenghi that almost had the same number of points than the MVP Caeleb Dressel in the first day, with only a four points difference. Due to an unlucky disqualification of Margherita Panziera the Team arrived 4^th for only half a point.

In the last race, the European Derby, the Centurions finished 3^rd behind Energy Standard and London Roar who eventually went on to place 1^st and 2^nd in the Championship Final in Las Vegas.

2020 International Swimming League season

Team roster

2021 International Swimming League season

Team roster

References

https://www.eurosport.it/nuoto/isl-staffetta-4100-napoli-spinge-gli-aqua-centurions-al-primo-posto_vid1250994/video.shtml
https://swimswam.com/aspettando-isl-gli-aqua-centurions-scateniamo-linferno/
https://www.swim4lifemagazine.it/tag/aqua-centurions/

International Swimming League